List of Tulu films produced in the Coastalwood in India that are released/scheduled to be released in the year 2022.

Releases

January – June

References 

Tulu
Tulu-language films
Tulu